Jhabrera Legislative Assembly constituency (SC) is one of the seventy electoral Uttarakhand Legislative Assembly constituencies of Uttarakhand state in India. It includes Jhabrera area of Haridwar District. Jhabrera Legislative Assembly constituency (SC) is a part of Haridwar (Lok Sabha constituency).

Members of Legislative Assembly

Election results

2022

References

External link
  

Haridwar
Assembly constituencies of Uttarakhand
2008 establishments in Uttarakhand
Constituencies established in 2008